The EFA Robert Blackburn Printmaking Workshop is a 4000 square foot printmaking facility in Manhattan. The space is run by the Elizabeth Foundation for the Arts, and modeled on a similar printmaking workshop run by Robert Blackburn. It features traditional printing, editioning rooms, steel facing services, stone preparation, photo lithography plate production, and risograph printing.

History
Robert Blackburn first established a workshop in 1947 in his loft apartment in Chelsea. The facility and its cooperative structure welcomed a variety of artists during the 1950s and 1960s. It formally incorporated into a not-for-profit organization called "Printmaking Workshop" in 1971, which lasted until 2001. Before his 2003 death, Blackburn encouraged the Elizabeth Foundation of the Arts to establish a new organization to provide similar services to artists in New York. The foundation agreed and opened new Printmaking Workshop, named in Blackburn's honor, in September 2005.

References

Arts centers in New York City
2005 establishments in New York City
Printmaking groups and organizations